Leyland railway station serves the town of Leyland in Lancashire, England. It was formerly "Golden Hill", the name of the street and area in which the station is based, but was renamed Leyland soon after opening. The original station was built in 1838, with two platforms.

Station
The station is located on the West Coast Main Line just south of Preston, and is the approximate halfway point between Glasgow and London, some 198 miles in either direction, with a placard on Leyland Trucks' Spurrier works stating this fact.

The station is currently a four-platform hub, with a part-time ticket office (staffed 06:45-17:45 Mondays to Saturdays and 08:15-15:45 Sundays). In 2011 new digital display screens were installed as well as an automated ticket machine and a new ticket office was built in 2014; A new pedestrian footbridge with lifts was built in 2016 bringing step-free access to all four platforms and an automated PA system was installed in 2018.

Former franchise holder First North Western ran Euston services from Blackpool which called at Leyland in the late 1990s but these were soon discontinued. Leyland station is now very much a commuter station from and to Preston, with links to Chorley, Wigan, Liverpool (after years of no "Southbound" services towards Wigan a 'local' service was resumed in 1988) and Manchester, with no long distance main line services calling at the station.

The station at Farington, Farington railway station was closed before the Beeching Plan of the 1960s and no direct trains run to Lostock Hall.

Services

On Sundays, 1 train per hour runs on both routes.

Gallery

References

External links

Railway stations in South Ribble
DfT Category D stations
Former North Union Railway stations
Railway stations in Great Britain opened in 1838
Northern franchise railway stations
Leyland, Lancashire
Stations on the West Coast Main Line